John J. Pershing Middle School may refer to:
Pershing Middle School (Houston) 
Pershing Middle School (San Diego)